Batu Ferringhi is a suburb of George Town in Penang, Malaysia. To cater to the influx of tourists, several major high-rise hotels have been established along the  stretch of beaches.

The beach resorts along Batu Ferringhi also offer various water sport activities, such as parasailing. On a clear day, one could get a picturesque view of the Andaman Sea and Mount Jerai, which is located within the neighbouring state of Kedah. In addition, Batu Ferringhi is famous for its night market that offers a wide variety of merchandise and street food.

There had been human activity within Batu Ferringhi as early as 1592, when an Englishman, Sir James Lancaster, arrived and began pillaging other vessels around Penang Island. However, for much of its recent history, Batu Ferringhi was a quiet village, until the urbanisation of the area beginning in the 1970s.

Due to its location along the northern coast of Penang Island, Batu Ferringhi was hard hit by the 2004 Indian Ocean earthquake and tsunami.

Etymology 
The word ferringhi or feringgi is the modern spelling of the Classical Malay word peringgi, originally used in reference to the Portuguese conquistadors before being applied to all people of European descent. It is cognate with the Thai farang and Khmer barang. All are derived from the Indian word firangī (फ़िरंगी) which itself originates either from the Arabic ferringi or Persian farangi. In the Middle East and Africa, it originally referred to the Franks but came to include Europeans in general.

Batu Ferringhi, therefore, would mean the place where Westerners had come ashore, with the Malay word batu (meaning rock) referring to the rocky shoreline of this particular area.

Among Tamils, the area is known as Paringgi Malai meaning "foreigner's hill".

History 
James Lancaster, an English privateer, came ashore at this particular area in 1592. This made Lancaster the first European to reach Penang Island. Having come ashore aboard the Edward Bonaventure, Lancaster and his crew proceeded to pillage every vessel they encountered for the next four months.

The urbanisation of Batu Ferringhi only began in the 1970s. This involved the construction of several hotels along the beaches, attracting locals and tourists alike. Condominiums soon followed, offering gorgeous views of the sea overlooking the Malay Peninsula. However, these developments did not come without problems, such as the deteriorating seawater quality that has led to the infestation of jellyfish around Batu Ferringhi.

Batu Ferringhi was one of the hardest hit areas during the 2004 Indian Ocean tsunami that ultimately claimed a total of 52 lives in Penang.

Transportation 
The main thoroughfare within Batu Ferringhi is the coastal Batu Ferringhi Road, part of Federal Route 6. Batu Ferringhi Road continues on from Tanjung Bungah Road, cutting through the heart of the suburb until it becomes Jalan Teluk Bahang at the western edge of Batu Ferringhi. The few roads within this suburb, including Batu Ferringhi Road, are prone to traffic congestion due to its popularity as a tourist destination.

Rapid Penang buses 101 and 102 serve the residents of the suburb, by connecting Batu Ferringhi with George Town and other destinations on Penang Island, such as Tanjung Bungah, Tanjung Tokong, the Penang International Airport and Queensbay Mall.

Another bus service, the Hop-On Hop-Off service, caters primarily to tourists. This service, which utilises open-topped double decker buses, includes three stops within Batu Ferringhi – an optional stop at Miami Beach and two standard stops at Holiday Inn and Hard Rock Hotel.

Education 

The school within the Batu Ferringhi suburb are the Uplands International School, which caters primarily to the expatriate community within this suburb as well as those from the neighbouring Tanjung Bungah suburb. The other is SJK (C) Pai Chai.

The nearest national public primary and high schools are situated at Tanjung Bungah.

Shopping 
Although Batu Ferringhi does not have a shopping centre, the suburb is notable for its night market. Souvenirs, DVDs, artworks, jerseys, and other apparels and accessories can be found at bargain prices within the night market, which is also lined with various food stalls that sell Penang's famed street cuisine and titbits.

Tourist attractions 

 Miami Beach
+ Moonlight Beach
 Shamrock Beach
 Lovers' Isle
 Batu Ferringhi Night Market
 Hard Rock Hotel

References

External links
 

Beaches of Malaysia
Populated places in Penang
George Town, Penang
Landforms of Penang